The Tears of the White Man: Compassion as Contempt is a 1983 book by the French philosopher Pascal Bruckner. It describes how the political left of the Western world has a sentimental view of the Third World. Bruckner criticises this and how it is used to revel in self-hatred and perceived guilt. The book was published in English in 1986, translated by William R. Beer.

Roger Kimball regards Bruckner's 2006 book The Tyranny of Guilt as a sequel to The Tears of the White Man.

Theme
Intellectual historian Richard Wolin described Tears of the White Man as "an unflinching attempt to come to grips with the conceit of Third Worldism... As the dreams of Soviet style Communism gradually soured, many on the left had transposed their allegiances to revolutionary insurgencies in the Southern Hemisphere: in Latin America, Africa, and Asia. They placed their chips on the virtue and the power of (Frantz Fanon's) 'the wretched of the earth.'"

Reception
Kirkus Reviews wrote: "Throughout Bruckner's debate, the tone of vehement insensitivity to possible ether points of view is reminiscent of the most egoistic American political writers. But Bruckner, as a novelist, has much greater verbal resources than most political hacks. Unfortunately, most of this is lost in an inept translation: in most political books, a humdrum translation may suffice, but Bruckner is so dependent on a musketeer-like verbal flourish that only the best French translators should have attempted this job."

Writing in Foreign Affairs in 1987, Fritz Stern described the book as "a diatribe against the ideologues of Western guilt, against pious compassion with and exaltation of Third World countries" which "turns into a polemic, sometimes against straw men". Stern added, "Altogether, a book that by being contemptuous itself misses its own considerable potential".

See also 

 White guilt

References

External links
 Publicity page at Éditions du Seuil's website 

1983 non-fiction books
Books in political philosophy
Éditions du Seuil books
French essays
French-language books
Works by Pascal Bruckner
Works about white people
Politics and race